A concept of design science was introduced in 1957 by R. Buckminster Fuller who defined it as a systematic form of designing. He expanded on this concept in his World Design Science Decade proposal to the International Union of Architects in 1961. The term was later used by S. A. Gregory in the 1965 'The Design Method' Conference where he drew the distinction between scientific method and design method. Gregory was clear in his view that design was not a science and that design science referred to the scientific study of design. Herbert Simon in his 1968 Karl Taylor Compton lectures used and popularized these terms in his argument for the scientific study of the artificial (as opposed to the natural). Over the intervening period the two uses of the term (systematic designing and study of designing) have co-mingled to the point where design science may have both meanings: a science of design and design as a science.

A science of design

Simon's The Sciences of the Artificial, first published in 1969, built on previous developments and motivated the further development of systematic and formalized design methodologies relevant to many design disciplines, for example architecture, engineering, urban planning, computer science, and management studies. Simon's ideas about the science of design also encouraged the development of design research and the scientific study of designing.

There has been recurrent concern to differentiate design from science. Nigel Cross differentiated between scientific design, design science and a science of design. A science of design (the scientific study of design) does not require or assume that the acts of designing are themselves scientific, and an increasing number of research programs take this view. Cross uses the term 'designerly ways of knowing' to distinguish designing from other kinds of human activity.

Design as a science

The  design-science relationship continues to be debated and there continue to be many efforts to reframe or reform design as science. For example, the axiomatic theory of design by Suh presents a domain independent theory that can explain or prescribe the design process. The Function-Behavior-Structure (FBS) ontology by Gero, presenting a domain independent ontology of design and designing, is another example.

Design as a science in information systems

There has been a particular emphasis on design as a science within information systems. Hevner and Chatterjee provide a reference on design science research (DSR) in Information Systems, including a selection of papers from the DESRIST conferences, a look at key principles of DSR, and the integration of action research with design research. Vaishnavi, Kuechler, and Petter offer a resource on design science research in information systems that outlines the origins and philosophical grounding for design science research, explains the design science methodology, and offers a bibliography of articles that discuss design science methods or offer exemplars of design science. In 2010, 122 professors promoted design science in information system research by signing a memorandum.

Hevner et al. provide a set of seven guidelines which help information systems researchers conduct, evaluate and present design-science research.  The seven guidelines address design as an artifact, problem relevance, design evaluation, research contributions, research rigor, design as a search process,  and research communication.

Later extensions of the design science research approach detail how design and research problems can be rationally decomposed by means of nested problem solving. It is also explained how the regulative cycle (problem investigation, solution design, design validation, solution implementation, and implementation evaluation) fits in the framework. Peffers et al. developed a model for producing and presenting information systems research that they called the design science research process. The Peffers et al. model has been used extensively and Adams provides an example of the process model being applied to create a digital forensic process model.

See also 
 
 Design methods
 Design research
 Design science research
 Design thinking

References

 

Design studies
Buckminster Fuller
Science studies
Research methods